Joshua Oluwadurotimi Emmanuel (born 18 August 1997) is an English professional footballer who plays as a right back for EFL League Two club Grimsby Town.

Emmanuel came through the youth academies of West Ham United and Ipswich Town before signing professional terms with the latter and going on to make 23 league appearances for the Tractor Boys between 2015 and 2019, as well as spending time on loan initially with Crawley Town. His loan spell during the 2017–18 season with Rotherham United saw him make 31 appearances for The Millers as they were promoted to the EFL Championship through the play-offs. He went on to have a spell with Shrewsbury Town before signing with Bolton Wanderers. He joined Hull City in 2020 and was part of the team who were champions of EFL League One during his first season.

Club career

Ipswich Town
Born in London, Emmanuel was a schoolboy at West Ham before joining the youth setup at Ipswich.

After progressing through the ranks at Ipswich Town, Emmanuel was called up by Manager Mick McCarthy for the first team on the pre-season tour of Ireland. After being given a number 29 shirt ahead of the new season, Emmanuel signed a professional contract at the club in August 2015, and made his competitive Ipswich debut against Brentford on 8 August 2015 in the first match of the 2015–16 season, in which he set up a goal for Kévin Bru in a 2–2 draw. He then had a handful of first team appearances throughout August before losing his first team place soon after. After his loan spell at Crawley Town came to an end, it wasn't until on 29 April 2016 when he made another appearance for the side, in a 3–2 win over MK Dons.

In the 2016–17 season, Emmanuel started the season on the substitutes bench and did not make his first appearance of the season until 24 September 2016 in a 1–0 loss to Leeds United. However, he appeared in several matches before being demoted to the substitutes bench after Adam Webster, who recovered from his injury. He then signed a two-year contract with the club, keeping him until 2019. Towards the end of the 2016–17 season, Emmanuel then began playing in the right-midfield position. By the end of the 2016–17 season, Emmanuel made the total of 17 appearances in all competitions.

Crawley Town (loan)
To gain first team experience, Emmanuel joined Crawley Town on loan on 26 November 2015, where he made his debut for the club in a 3–1 loss against Carlisle United three days later. He returned to Ipswich on 3 January 2016.

Rotherham United (loan)
Emmanuel joined Rotherham United on a season-long loan deal on 13 July 2017. He made his Rotherham United debut, starting the match and playing the full 90 minutes, in a 2–0 loss against Fleetwood Town in the opening game of the season. He went on to make 31 league appearances for Rotherham as the club earned promotion to the EFL Championship, and was voted the club's young player of the year.

Shrewsbury Town (loan)
In August 2018 Emmanuel joined Shrewsbury Town on loan for the 2018–19 season. He made 14 league appearances for the Shrews before returning to Ipswich on 18 January 2019, after being recalled from his loan spell.

Bolton Wanderers
On 2 September 2019, Emmanuel joined Bolton Wanderers on a contract until the end of the season, following his release from Ipswich Town a few hours earlier. He made his debut on 14 September, starting against Rotherham United in a 6–1 defeat. On 26 June it was announced Emmanuel would be one of 14 senior players released at the end of his contract on 30 June.

Hull City
On 7 August 2020, it was announced that Emmanuel would join newly relegated League One club Hull City on a free transfer. Emmanuel signed a two-year deal, with an optional one-year extension.
Emmanuel played his first game for the club on 5 September 2020, in the first round of the EFL Cup away against Sunderland, which Hull won on penalties after a 0–0 draw.
On 18 May 2022, Hull City exercised an option for an additional year on his contract.

Grimsby Town
On 31 January 2023, Emmanuel signed a deal with Grimsby Town until the end of the season for an undisclosed fee.

Personal life
Emmanuel is of Nigerian descent. Growing up in Harlow, Essex, Emmanuel supported Arsenal and was raised as a Christian, crediting it for force in his life. Emmanuel revealed that he used to play rugby when he was young and was even offered a trial at Saracens but made it clear he wanted to be a footballer and wouldn't consider rugby as an alternative.

Career statistics

Honours
Rotherham United
EFL League One play-offs: 2018

Hull City
EFL League One: 2020–21

Individual
Rotherham United Young Player of the Year: 2017–18

References

External links

1997 births
Living people
Footballers from Greater London
English footballers
Association football defenders
Ipswich Town F.C. players
Crawley Town F.C. players
Rotherham United F.C. players
Shrewsbury Town F.C. players
Bolton Wanderers F.C. players
Hull City A.F.C. players
Grimsby Town F.C. players
English Football League players
English people of Nigerian descent
Black British sportspeople